The following outline is provided as an overview of and topical guide to the field of Meteorology.

 Meteorology  The interdisciplinary, scientific study of the Earth's atmosphere with the primary focus being to understand, explain, and forecast weather events.  Meteorology, is applied to and employed by a wide variety of diverse fields, including the military, energy production, transport, agriculture, and construction.

Essence of meteorology 

Meteorology
 Climate – the average and variations of weather in a region over long periods of time.
 Meteorology – the interdisciplinary scientific study of the atmosphere that focuses on weather processes and forecasting (in contrast with climatology).
 Weather – the set of all the phenomena in a given atmosphere at a given time.

Branches of meteorology 
Microscale meteorology – the study of atmospheric phenomena about 1 km or less, smaller than mesoscale, including small and generally fleeting cloud "puffs" and other small cloud features
Mesoscale meteorology – the study of weather systems about 5 kilometers to several hundred kilometers, smaller than synoptic scale systems but larger than microscale and storm-scale cumulus systems, skjjoch as sea breezes, squall lines, and mesoscale convective complexes
Synoptic scale meteorology – is a horizontal length scale of the order of 1000 kilometres (about 620 miles) or more

Methods in meteorology 

 Surface weather analysis – a special type of weather map that provides a view of weather elements over a geographical area at a specified time based on information from ground-based weather stations

Weather forecasting 
Weather forecasting – the application of science and technology to predict the state of the atmosphere for a future time and a given location

Data collection 
 Pilot Reports

Weather maps 
Weather map
 Surface weather analysis

Forecasts and reporting of 
 Atmospheric pressure
 Dew point
 High-pressure area
 Ice
 Black ice
 Frost
 Low-pressure area
 Precipitation
 Temperature
 Weather front
 Wind chill
 Wind direction
 Wind speed

Instruments and equipment of meteorology 
 Anemometer – a device for measuring wind speed; used in weather stations
 Barograph – an aneroid barometer that records the barometric pressure over time and produces a paper or foil chart called a barogram
 Barometer – an instrument used to measure atmospheric pressure using either water, air, or mercury; useful for forecasting short term changes in the weather

 Ceiling balloon – a balloon, with a known ascent rate, used to measure the height of the base of clouds during daylight
 Ceiling projector – a device that is used, in conjunction with an alidade, to measure the height of the base of clouds
 Ceilometer – a device that uses a laser or other light source to measure the height of the base of clouds.
 Dark adaptor goggles – clear, red-tinted plastic goggles used either for adapting the eyes to dark prior to night observation or to help identify clouds during bright sunshine or glare from snow
 Disdrometer – an instrument used to measure the drop size, distribution, and velocity of falling hydrometeors
 Field mill – an instrument used to measure the strength of electric fields in the atmosphere near thunderstorm clouds
 Hygrometer – an instrument used to measure humidity
 Ice Accretion Indicator – an L-shaped piece of aluminum 15 inches (38 cm) long by 2 inches (5 cm) wide used to indicate the formation of ice, frost, or the presence of freezing rain or freezing drizzle
 Lidar (LIght raDAR) – an optical remote sensing technology used in atmospheric physics (among other fields) that measures the properties of scattered light to find information about a distant target
 Lightning detector – a device, either ground-based, mobile, or space-based, that detects lightning produced by thunderstorms
 Nephelometer – an instrument used to measure suspended particulates in a liquid or gas colloid. Gas-phase nephelometers are used to provide information on atmospheric visibility and albedo
 Nephoscope – an instrument for measuring the altitude, direction, and velocity of clouds
 Pyranometer – A type of actinometer found in many meteorological stations used to measure broadband solar irradiance
 Radar – see Weather radar
 Radiosonde – an instrument used in weather balloons that measures various atmospheric parameters and transmits them to a fixed receiver
 Rain gauge – an instrument that gathers and measures the amount of liquid precipitation over a set period of time
 Snow gauge – an instrument that gathers and measures the amount of solid precipitation over a set period of time
 SODAR (SOnic Detection And Ranging) – an instrument that measures the scattering of sound waves by atmospheric turbulence
 Solarimeter – a pyranometer, an instrument used to measure combined direct and diffuse solar radiation
 Sounding rocket – an instrument-carrying sub-orbital rocket designed to take measurements and perform scientific experiments
 Stevenson screen – part of a standard weather station, it shields instruments from precipitation and direct heat radiation while still allowing air to circulate freely
 Sunshine recorders – devices used to indicate the amount of sunshine at a given location
 Thermograph – a chart recorder that measures and records both temperature and humidity
 Thermometer – a device that measures temperature or temperature gradient
 Weather balloon – a high-altitude balloon that carries instruments aloft and uses a radiosonde to send back information on atmospheric pressure, temperature, and humidity
 Weather radar – a type of radar used to locate precipitation, calculate its motion, estimate its type (rain, snow, hail, etc.) and forecast its future position and intensity
 Weather vane – a movable device attached to an elevated object such as a roof that shows the direction of the wind
 Windsock – a conical textile tube designed to indicate wind direction and relative wind speed
 Wind profiler – equipment that uses radar or SODAR to detect wind speed and direction at various elevations

History of meteorology 

 History of weather forecasting – prior to the invention of meteorological instruments, weather analysis and prediction relied on pattern recognition, which was not always reliable
 History of surface weather analysis – initially used to study storm behavior, now used to explain current weather and as an aid in short term weather forecasting

Meteorological phenomena 
 Atmospheric pressure – the pressure at any given point in the Earth's atmosphere
 Cloud – a visible mass of droplets or frozen crystals floating in the atmosphere above the surface of a planet
 Rain – precipitation in which separate drops of water fall to the Earth from clouds, a product of the condensation of atmospheric water vapor
 Snow – precipitation in the form of crystalline water ice, consisting of a multitude of snowflakes that fall from clouds

 Freezing rain – precipitation that falls from a cloud as snow, melts completely on its way down, then passes through a layer of below-freezing air becoming supercooled, at which point it will freeze upon impact with any object encountered
 Sleet – term used in the United States and Canada for precipitation consisting of small, translucent ice balls, usually smaller than hailstones
 Tropical cyclone – a storm system with a low-pressure center and numerous thunderstorms that produce strong winds and flooding rain
 Extratropical cyclone – a low-pressure weather system occurring in the middle latitudes of the Earth having neither tropical nor polar characteristics
 Weather front – a boundary separating two masses of air of different densities; the principal cause of meteorological phenomena
 Low pressure – a region where the atmospheric pressure is lower in relation to the surrounding area
 Storm – any disturbed state of the atmosphere and strongly implying severe weather
 Flooding – an overflow of an expanse of water that submerges the land; a deluge
 Nor'easter – a macro-scale storm along the East Coast of the United States, named for the winds that come from the northeast
 Wind – the flow of air or other gases that compose an atmosphere; caused by rising heated air and cooler air rushing in to occupy the vacated space.
 Temperature – a physical property that describes our common notions of hot and cold
 Invest (meteorology) – An area with the potential for tropical cyclone development

Weather-related disasters 
 Weather disasters
 Extreme weather
 List of floods
 List of natural disasters by death toll
 List of severe weather phenomena

Leaders in meteorology 

 William M. Gray (October 9, 1929 – April 16, 2016) – has been involved in forecasting hurricanes since 1984
 Francis Galton (February 16, 1822 - January 17, 1911) – was a polymath, and devised the first weather map, proposed a theory of anticyclones, and was the first to establish a complete record of short-term climatic phenomena on a European scale
 Herbert Saffir (March 29, 1917 – November 21, 2007) – was the developer of the Saffir-Simpson Hurricane Scale for measuring the intensity of hurricanes
 Bob Simpson (November 19, 1912 – December 18, 2014) – was a meteorologist, hurricane specialist, first director of the National Hurricane Research Project, former director of the National Hurricane Center, and co-developer of the Saffir-Simpson Hurricane Scale.

See also 

 Meteorology
 Glossary of meteorology
 Index of meteorology articles
 Standard day
 Jet stream
 Heat index
 Equivalent potential temperature (Theta-e)
 Primitive equations

Climate:
 El Niño
 Monsoon
 Flood
 Drought
 Global warming
 Effect of sun angle on climate

Other phenomena:
 Deposition
 Dust devil
 Fog
 Tide
 Air mass
 Evaporation
 Sublimation
 Crepuscular rays
 Anticrepuscular rays

External links 

See weather forecasting#External links for weather forecast sites
Air Quality Meteorology - Online course that introduces the basic concepts of meteorology and air quality necessary to understand meteorological computer models. Written at a bachelor's degree level.
The GLOBE Program - (Global Learning and Observations to Benefit the Environment) An international environmental science and education program that links students, teachers, and the scientific research community in an effort to learn more about the environment through student data collection and observation.
Glossary of Meteorology - From the American Meteorological Society, an excellent reference of nomenclature, equations, and concepts for the more advanced reader.
JetStream - An Online School for Weather - National Weather Service
Learn About Meteorology - Australian Bureau of Meteorology
The Weather Guide - Weather Tutorials and News at About.com
Meteorology Education and Training (MetEd) - The COMET Program
NOAA Central Library - National Oceanic & Atmospheric Administration
The World Weather 2010 Project The University of Illinois at Urbana-Champaign
Ogimet - online data from meteorological stations of the world, obtained through NOAA free services
National Center for Atmospheric Research Archives, documents the history of meteorology
Weather forecasting and Climate science - United Kingdom Meteorological Office

Meteorology
Meteorology